This is a list of years in Australian television.

Twenty-first century

Twentieth century

See also

List of years in Australia
List of Australian films
List of years in television

Australian television-related lists
Television
 
Australian television